The 1965 National Football League draft was held at the Summit Hotel in New York City on Saturday, November 28, 1964. The first player selected was Tucker Frederickson, back from Auburn, by the New York Giants.

The draft was marked by the failure of the St. Louis Cardinals to sign quarterback Joe Namath of Alabama, who went with the New York Jets of the American Football League. The AFL draft was held the same day.

Player selections

Round one

Round two

Round three

Round four

Round five

Round six

Round seven

Round eight

Round nine

Round ten

Round eleven

Round twelve

Round thirteen

Round fourteen

Round fifteen

Round sixteen

Round seventeen

Round eighteen

Round nineteen

Round twenty

Hall of Famers
Five members of the Pro Football Hall of Fame were taken in the 1965 NFL draft:
 Gale Sayers, halfback from University of Kansas taken 1st round 4th overall by the Chicago Bears.
Inducted: Professional Football Hall of Fame class of 1977.
 Dick Butkus, linebacker from University of Illinois at Urbana–Champaign taken 1st round 3rd overall by the Chicago Bears.
Inducted: Professional Football Hall of Fame class of 1979.
 Joe Namath, quarterback from Alabama taken 1st round 12th overall by the St. Louis Cardinals but signed with the New York Jets.
Inducted: Professional Football Hall of Fame class of 1985.
 Fred Biletnikoff, wide receiver from Florida State taken 3rd round 39th overall by the Detroit Lions but signed with the Oakland Raiders.
Inducted: Professional Football Hall of Fame class of 1988.
 Chris Hanburger, linebacker from the University of North Carolina taken in the 18th round, 245th overall by the Washington Redskins.
Inducted: Professional Football Hall of Fame class of 2011.

Notable undrafted players

See also
 1965 American Football League Draft

References

External links
 NFL.com – 1965 Draft
 databaseFootball.com – 1965 Draft
 Pro Football Hall of Fame

National Football League Draft
Draft
NFL Draft
American football in New York City
1960s in Manhattan
Sporting events in New York City
NFL Draft